Singulisphaera mucilagenosa is an acid-tolerant bacterium from the genus of Singulisphaera which has been isolated from dystrophic humified water.

References

Bacteria described in 2011